Mates by Irvine Sellars was a British fashion retail chain founded by Irvine Sellar.

Mates started with one shop is Soho's Carnaby Street and grew to become "Britain’s second-biggest fashion chain" with 90 shops in 1981, when it was sold to a South African investor.

Sellar claimed that Mates was the first retail chain to sell men's and women's clothing under the same roof, and that they had 3,000 employees.

References

Clothing retailers of the United Kingdom
British brands
1960s fashion
1970s fashion
1980s fashion